Torhi Harper (born December 18 1979), better known by his stage name Murphy Lee, is an American rapper, best known as a member of the hip hop group St. Lunatics. His debut album, Murphy's Law, peaked at number 8 on the Billboard 200 music chart in October of 2003. It was released on September 23, 2003 and was certified gold on November 17, 2003. It featured the single from the Bad Boys II Soundtrack "Shake Your Tailfeather" (with Nelly and P. Diddy).

Discography

Studio albums

Singles

Featured singles

Guest appearances
 2001: "Batter Up" (Nelly featuring Murphy Lee & Ali)
 2001: "Thicky Thick Girl" (Nelly featuring Murphy Lee & Ali)
 2001: "Steal the Show" (Nelly featuring Ali, Murphy Lee, & Kyjuan)
 2001: "Wrap Sumden" (Nelly featuring Ali, Murphy Lee, & Kyjuan)
 2002: "Dem Boyz" (Nelly featuring Kyjuan & Murphy Lee)
 2002: "Oh Nelly" (Nelly featuring Murphy Lee)
 2002: "Air Force Ones" (Nelly featuring Ali, Murphy Lee, & Kyjuan)
 2002: "Roc the Mic (Remix)" (Nelly featuring Freeway, Murphy Lee, & Beanie Sigel)
 2002: "CG 2" (Nelly featuring Kyjuan & Murphy Lee)
 2002: "Boughetto" (Ali featuring Murphy Lee)
 2003: "Welcome to Atlanta (Remix)" (Ludacris featuring P. Diddy, Murphy Lee, & Snoop Dogg)
 2003: "Drop Dead Gorgeous" (Kanye West ft. Murphy Lee)
 2004: "Tipsy" (Remix) (J-Kwon ft. Chingy, Murphy Lee and DJ Clue)
 2004: "River Don't Runnin'" (Nelly featuring Murphy Lee & Stephen Marley)
 2004: "Getcha Getcha" (Nelly featuring Ali, Murphy Lee, & Kyjuan)
 2007: "Work Dat, Twerk Dat" (Ali & Gipp ft. Murphy Lee and DJ Speedy)
 2007: "Throw Some D's" (Remix) (Rich Boy ft. Lil' Jon, Andre 3000, Jim Jones, Nelly, Murphy Lee and The Game)
 2007: Duffle Bag Boy (Remix) (Playaz Circle featuring Lil Wayne and Murphy Lee)
 2009: "Think About It" (Darren B ft. Murphy Lee & Gena)
 2010: "Sell Out Everything" (DJ Freddy Fred ft. Young Buck, Murphy Lee & Gunplay)
 2010: "k.I.s.s"   (Nelly ft. Diddy-Dirty Money & Murphy Lee)
 2012: "GO" (Nelly ft. Murphy Lee and City Spud)
 2014: "The Reason Why" (Daz Dillinger ft. Short Khop, Young Buck, Bo$$ and Murphy Lee)

Collaborations with St. Lunatics
2001: Free City (with St. Lunatics)

Mixtapes
My Name Is Lee (2002)
Batter Up (2007)
The Return of SuperMan BigLee (2008)

References

External links
Official website

Grammy Award winners for rap music
Living people
Rappers from St. Louis
St. Lunatics members
21st-century American rappers
21st-century American male musicians
1983 births